Average and total utilitarianism (also called averagism and totalism) are variants of utilitarianism that seek to maximize the average or total amount of utility; following Henry Sidgwick's question, "Is it total or average happiness that we seek to make a maximum?". They are theories of population ethics, a philosophical field that deals with problems arising when our actions affect the number or identity of individuals born in the future.

Total utilitarianism

Total utilitarianism is a method of applying utilitarianism to a group to work out what the best set of outcomes would be. It assumes that the target utility is the maximum utility across the population based on adding all the separate utilities of each individual together.

The main problem for total utilitarianism is the "mere addition paradox", which argues that a likely outcome of following total utilitarianism is a future where there is a large number of people with very low utility values. Parfit terms this "the repugnant conclusion", believing it to be intuitively undesirable.

To survive the mere addition paradox with a consistent model of total utilitarianism, total utilitarians have two choices. They may either assert that higher utility living is on a completely different scale from, and thus incomparable to, the bottom levels of utility, or deny that there is anything wrong with the repugnant conclusion.  (Although, Sikora argues that we may already be living within this minimal state. Particularly as quality of life measurements are generally relative and we cannot know how we would appear to a society with very high quality of life.)

Average utilitarianism
Average utilitarianism values the maximization of the average utility among a group's members. So a group of 100 people each with 100 hedons (or "happiness points") is judged as preferable to a group of 1,000 people with 99 hedons each.  More counter intuitively still, average utilitarianism evaluates the existence of a single person with 100 hedons more favorably than an outcome in which a million people have an average utility of 99 hedons.

Average utilitarianism may lead to repugnant conclusions if practiced strictly. Aspects of Parfit's mere addition paradox are still relevant here: Even though "Parfit's repugnant conclusion" (mentioned above) is avoided by average utilitarianism, some generally repugnant conclusions may still obtain. For instance, if there are two completely isolated societies, one a 100-hedon society and the other a 99-hedon society, then strict average utilitarianism seems to support killing off the 99-hedon society (this violent action would increase the average utility in this scenario). This criticism is also exemplified by Nozick's utility monster, a hypothetical being with a greater ability to gain utility from resources, who takes all those resources from people in a fashion that is seen as completely immoral. Nozick writes: Utilitarian theory is embarrassed by the possibility of utility monsters who get enormously greater sums of utility from any sacrifice of others than these others lose ... the theory seems to require that we all be sacrificed in the monster's maw.  It is also exemplified when Nozick writes: Maximizing the average utility allows a person to kill everyone else if that would make him ecstatic, and so happier than average. 

Parfit himself provided another similar criticism. Average utilitarianism seems to reject what Parfit calls "mere addition": the addition or creation of new lives that, although they may not be as happy as the average (and thus bring down the average), may still be intuitively well worth living. Creating a less-than-average life would become an immoral act. Furthermore, in a world where everyone was experiencing very bad lives that were not worth living, adding more people whose lives were also not worth living, but were less unpleasant than the lives of those who already existed, would raise the average, and appear to be a moral duty.

The hazards of average utilitarianism are potentially avoided if it is applied more pragmatically. For instance, the practical application of rule utilitarianism (or else two-level utilitarianism) may temper the aforementioned undesirable conclusions. That is, actually practicing a rule that we must "kill anyone who is less happy than average" would almost certainly cause suffering in the long run. Alternatively, average utilitarianism may be bolstered by a "life worth living" threshold. This threshold would be placed very low (intense suffering) and it is only once a person drops below this threshold that we begin to consider their execution. This obtains the intuition that a generally lower 'average utility' is to be endured provided there are no individuals who would be "better off dead". This would also allow average utilitarianism to acknowledge the general human preference for life.

Average utilitarianism is treated as being so obvious that it does not need any explanation in Garrett Hardin's essay The Tragedy of the Commons, where he points out that Jeremy Bentham's goal of "the greatest good for the greatest number" is impossible. Here he is saying that it is impossible to maximize both population (not total happiness) and 'good' (which he takes as meaning per capita happiness), although the same principle of course applies to average and total happiness. His conclusion "we want the maximum good per person" is taken as being self-evident.

Proponents of the so-called "negative average preference utilitarianism", such as Roger Chao, argue that such an ethical framework avoids the Repugnant Conclusion and leads to few, if any, counterintuitive results.

See also
 Population ethics
 Ecological fallacy

References

Utilitarianism
Population ethics